Mazapilitinae is a subfamily of Upper Jurassic ammonites included in the Oppeliidae. Shells are involute; venter rounded or gently tabulate; ribbing coarse, fold-like, branching.

Genera include Mazapilites, Submazapilites, and Eurynoticeras, which have been found in Kimmeridgian age marine sediments in southern Europe and Mexico.

References

Oppeliidae
Jurassic ammonites
Kimmeridgian first appearances
Late Jurassic extinctions